The 2022 Caribbean Club Shield was the fifth and final edition of the Caribbean Club Shield (also known as the CFU Club Shield), the second-tier annual international club football competition in the Caribbean region, held amongst clubs whose football associations are affiliated with the Caribbean Football Union (CFU), a sub-confederation of CONCACAF.

The winners of the 2022 CONCACAF Caribbean Club Shield, as long as they fulfill the CONCACAF Regional Club Licensing criteria, play against the fourth place team of the 2022 CONCACAF Caribbean Club Championship in a playoff match to determine the final Caribbean spot to the 2022 CONCACAF League.

With the expansion of the CONCACAF Champions League starting from the 2024 edition, the 2022 edition of the Caribbean Club Shield was the last held. Instead, it will be replaced by the CFU Cup, which will be launched as a qualifying tournament for the Caribbean Cup (Which in of itself acts as a qualifying tournament for the CONCACAF Champions League) for teams besides those which are from professional leagues in the Caribbean.

Robinhood, having won the title in 2019, were the title holders, since the 2020 and 2021 editions were cancelled due to the COVID-19 pandemic and the titles were not awarded.

In the final, Bayamon FC defeated Inter Moengotapoe, 2–1, after extra-time with a game-winning goal scored by Jordi Ranera in the 121st minute, to win their first title.

Teams
Among the 31 CFU member associations, 27 of them were classified as non-professional leagues and each may enter one team in the CONCACAF Caribbean Club Shield.

Associations which did not enter a team

Notes

Group stage 
The draw for the group stage was held on 3 February 2022, 11:00 EST (UTC−5), at the CONCACAF Headquarters in Miami, United States. The 13 teams were drawn into four groups: one group of four teams and three groups of three teams. The team from the host association Puerto Rico, Bayamon FC, were allocated to position A1, while the remaining 12 teams were drawn into the other group positions without any seeding.

The winners of each group advance to the semi-finals.

All times local, AST (UTC−4).

Group A

Group B

Group C

Knockout stage

Bracket
The semi-final matchups are:
2nd Best Group Winner vs. 3rd Best Group Winner 
Best Group Winner vs. Best Ranked second-place finisher

If the best ranked second-place finisher is from the same group as the Best Group Winner, then the semifinal matchups will be as follows:
2nd Best Group Winner vs. Best Ranked second-place finisher 
Best Group Winner vs. 3rd Best Group Winner

Semi-finals

Third place match

Final
Winner advanced to CONCACAF League playoff against 2022 CONCACAF Caribbean Club Championship fourth-placed team for a place in 2022 CONCACAF League preliminary round, as long as they comply with the minimum CONCACAF Club Licensing requirements for the CONCACAF League.

See also
2022 Caribbean Club Championship
2022 CONCACAF League
2023 CONCACAF Champions League

References

External links
Caribbean Club Shield, CONCACAF.com

2022
2